Ivan Nikolayevich Durnovo (the patronymic is also transcribed as Nikolaevich;  – ) was a Russian political figure. He served as Chairman of the Committee of Ministers between 1895 and 1903, the precursor to the post of prime minister.

Biography 
Ivan Nikolaevich Durnovo was born on 1 (13) March 1834 in Chernigov Governorate (which was located mostly within northeastern Ukraine and Russia's Bryansk Oblast) to the noble Durnovo family. He attended Prince Michael Artillery Academy in Saint Petersburg.

After a brief time in the military, he returned to civilian life and was elected by the nobility of his uyezd (district) to the position of the Marshal of Nobility. Later he occupied a similar position for the entire Chernigov Governorate. He served as the Governor of Chernigov Governorate (1863–1870) and Yekaterinoslav Governorate (1870–1882). From 1882 he was in Saint Petersburg, starting as a Deputy Minister of Interior (1882–1886).

Although not a capable statesman, he was a good communicator, capable to earn trust of his superiors. Count Sergei Witte described him as "a pleasant Marshal of Nobility, a pleasant governor, a pleasant Deputy Minister of the Interior. But he was not a cultured or intelligent person; rather, one rather limited in his abilities. A hospitable, polite, and very cunning man."

On the Empress's recommendation, in 1886 Durnovo was appointed the chair of the Fourth Section of His Imperial Majesty's Own Chancellery, the office responsible for charitable institution and health care. 
In 1889, after the death of the Minister of Interior Dmitry Tolstoy, Durnovo was appointed to replace him.

In social policy, Durnovo's tenure in office saw a reduction of working hours in 1897. Durnovo was not known, however, for his innovations, but rather for following his predecessor's policies. His abilities were summarized by his staff in a pun, "Не нашли хорошего, назначили Дурново" (They could not find a good minister, so they have appointed a bad [durnogo = Durnovo] one!").
Durnovo was blamed by later researchers for failing to take decisive actions to handle the Russian famine of 1891–92.

In 1895, the next emperor, Nicholas II promoted Durnovo to the job of the  Chairman of the Committee of Ministers. At the time, this was the top of the Russian bureaucratic ladder, as the separate position of the Prime Minister of Russia was not introduced until 1905. Durnovo was not to see that reform, though: he died on the job, on 29 May (11 June, in Gregorian Calendar) 1903, near Berlin. His leadership qualities, not entirely admired by his colleagues, earned him the nickname of "Телячья голова" (Head of Veal).

References
Дурново Иван Николаевич, based in turn on A.P. Shikman (Шикман А.П.), "Personalities of Our Nation's History. Biographical Handbook." (Деятели отечественной истории. Биографический справочник). Moscow, 1997, .
 Дурново Иван Николаевич (from Great Soviet Encyclopedia)

1834 births
1903 deaths
People from Chernigov Governorate
Marshals of nobility
Politicians of the Russian Empire
Interior ministers of Russia
Members of the State Council (Russian Empire)
Ivan
Burials at Tikhvin Cemetery